Plantation Plenty, also known as the Isaac Manchester House is a historic building in Avella, Pennsylvania.

It is designated as a historic residential landmark/farmstead by the Washington County History & Landmarks Foundation.  It was listed on the National Register of Historic Places in 1975, with a boundary enlargement and renaming in 2016.

The property is endangered by longwall coal mining.  In 2011, it was named to the list of America's Most Endangered Places by the National Trust for Historic Preservation.

References

External links 

Manchester-Farms, Avella, Pennsylvania
[ National Register nomination form]

Houses on the National Register of Historic Places in Pennsylvania
Georgian architecture in Pennsylvania
Houses completed in 1815
Houses in Washington County, Pennsylvania
National Register of Historic Places in Washington County, Pennsylvania